Juan Sebastián Botero (born July 4, 1986, in Ames, Iowa), is an American-born Colombian soccer midfielder that played for Atlético Huila in the Colombian First Division before retiring from his professional activity as a soccer player. His parents moved from Colombia to the United States before he was born.

Football career
Then, Botero and his family moved back to Colombia when he was one year old, and he joined the Independiente Medellín youth system at age 13. He made his professional first team debut for Medellin at age 17, on August 3, 2003, versus Atletico Huila. In his four years with the club, he went on to make 46 first team appearances, playing his final game in June 2007 against Cúcuta Deportivo.

In 2003, Botero played for Colombia's Under-17 national team in the South American championships, held in Bolivia, scoring a goal against Paraguay while also playing against Argentina, Brazil, Bolivia, and Uruguay. This Colombian team was directed by coach Eduardo Lara.  

Botero was on the development roster with FC Dallas during 2007, but was waived at the end of the year. He was later picked up to play for CD Atlético Huila to perform in the Copa Mustang in Colombia.

He was later chosen by Atlético Huila to play in the Colombian First Division in Colombia. He played for Once Caldas during the second half of 2009. Then, in 2012 he was hired by Cúcuta Deportivo.

Retirement from professional football

In 2013 and after playing with the Rionegro club and again with Atlético Huila, Botero decided to retire from his activity as a professional soccer player in Colombia. From that moment on, he dedicated himself to coaching minor soccer divisions in the South American country, including Deportivo Independiente Medellín. Likewise, in later years, he began to give sports conferences, narrating and teaching about the soccer sports career, starting in minor divisions, until reaching the professional soccer environment.

Clubs 

Most of his sports career was developed in Colombia, a country where he continued to live after retiring as a professional player.

References

External links 
 Juan Sebastián Botero Arango, Postbon League (page in Spanish)

1986 births
Living people
Colombian footballers
Colombia youth international footballers
American soccer players
American people of Colombian descent
Independiente Medellín footballers
FC Dallas players
Atlético Huila footballers
Soccer players from Iowa
Once Caldas footballers
Cúcuta Deportivo footballers
Leones F.C. footballers
Categoría Primera A players
Association football midfielders